Charles Cecil (c.1695 – 29 May 1737) was the Bishop of Bristol before being translated as the Bishop of Bangor in 1734 until his death in 1737.

Cecil was the only surviving son of Robert Cecil (an MP, son of James Cecil, 3rd Earl of Salisbury and Margaret née Manners). Cecil's sister, Margaret, married Robert Brown, who was created a baronet.

See also
 Bangor Cathedral

References

External links
 Bangor episcopal succession listing

17th-century births
1737 deaths
Alumni of the University of Cambridge
18th-century Welsh Anglican bishops
Bishops of Bristol
Bishops of Bangor
Charles
18th-century Church of England bishops